ICSID may refer to:

 International Centre for Settlement of Investment Disputes
 International Council of Societies of Industrial Design